The  is a river in Japan which originates in the city of Mizunami in Gifu Prefecture, and flows into the Kiso River.

Geography
The river originates in the western portion of Mizunami, and flows through the city of Kani. On the upper portion of the river, the Kobuchi Dam was constructed to improve flood control and protect the water for agricultural use.

References

Rivers of Gifu Prefecture
Rivers of Japan